George Caldwell Dickins (17 November 1821 – 5 December 1903) was an English soldier and amateur cricketer. He played in seven first-class cricket matches between 1848 and 1864.

Early life
Dickins was born at North Elmham in Norfolk and was educated at Harrow School. He was the son of Watson and Mary Dickins, his father being a Church of England priest, and the family lived in Kent during at least some of Dickins' early life.

Army career
After leaving Harrow, Dickins was commissioned into the British Army in 1842, initially as an ensign in the 98th (Prince of Wales's) Regiment of Foot. He transferred to the Royal Scots Fusiliers almost immediately and served until 1848 in the East Indies, being promoted to lieutenant in 1846. On returning to Britain in 1848 he served in Scotland, the north of England and in Ireland, transferring to the 46th Regiment of Foot as a captain.

He resigned his commission in 1854 and the following year joined a contingent of British ex-servicemen to fight in the Crimean War with the rank of major. He left the unit shortly before it was disbanded in 1858.

Cricket
Although he did not play for the school First XI, Dickins was a keen club cricketer. He played some of his cricket whilst serving in Scotland, the north of England and Ireland. He made his first-class debut for the Gentlemen of Kent during 1848 at Canterbury, shortly after returning from service in the East Indies. He played seven first-class matches, five for the Gentlemen of Kent and two for Kent County Cricket Club, both against Yorkshire, one in 1849 and the other in 1864. He played for Kelso, Northumberland and Roxburghshire regularly and for Scotland sides against touring sides of professionals.

Family and later life
Dickins married Frances Collingwood in 1851 at Durham. Two of their sons are known to have played club cricket in Scotland. The family lived in Northumberland and southern Scotland. Dickins was declared bankrupt in 1865 and Frances died in 1867.

Dickins died in 1903 at Coldstream in the Scottish borders. He was aged 82.

Notes

References

External links

1821 births
1903 deaths
Royal Scots Fusiliers officers
British Army personnel of the Crimean War
19th-century British Army personnel
Military personnel from Norfolk
46th Regiment of Foot officers
98th Regiment of Foot officers
English cricketers
Kent cricketers
People from North Elmham
Sportspeople from Norfolk
Gentlemen of Kent cricketers
People from Adisham